Trinity African Methodist Episcopal Church is a historic church located on New Jersey Route 49 (Bridgeton-Milltown Pike) in the Gouldtown section of Fairfield Township in Cumberland County, New Jersey, United States. The current church was built in 1860, on the eve of the American Civil War. It was added to the National Register of Historic Places on September 29, 1995, for its significance in religion and African-American history.

History and description
Gouldtown is now just a crossroads with a few buildings, but it is one of the oldest settlements in America founded by free, land-owning African-Americans. The Rev. Ruben Cuff of Salem County organized a society of African Americans in 1818. In 1823 they bought an unused schoolhouse to use as a church, and in 1834 they bought a second schoolhouse and moved it to the site.

See also
National Register of Historic Places listings in Cumberland County, New Jersey

References

African Methodist Episcopal churches in New Jersey
Churches on the National Register of Historic Places in New Jersey
Churches completed in 1860
Churches in Cumberland County, New Jersey
National Register of Historic Places in Cumberland County, New Jersey
New Jersey Register of Historic Places
Fairfield Township, Cumberland County, New Jersey